Alexander Hagen (born 1 January 1955 in Lübeck) is a German sailor. 
Hagen won the world championship in the Star Class in 1981 and 1997. He also won 7 Continental Championships (silver stars) and the European Championship in OK-Dinghy in 1975. 
The 1981 Star World Championships were held in Marblehead, United States in 1981. It was the first time since Pim von Huetschler in the 40th that non american sailors won the prestigious Worlds Title. It were Alexander Hagen and Vincent Hoesch from Germany that rocked the Star Class in the early 80th with Laser like downwind technics and light body weight. They were struggling upwind because of minor crew weight. They managed to reach the 1st mark in 10th position but were "flying" on the reach to call for room at the jibing mark into 1st position. They were rocking the boat and pumping sails like sitting on a Laser to extend their lead. Then it was easy to defend the lead from the front despite their poor upwind speed. Two Years later rocking and pumping was forbidden by the IYRU-Racing Rules. 16 Years later Alex Hagen won the Star Worlds again in Marblehead. This time Marcelo Ferreira (crew of Torben Grael) was crewing.
Hagen also competed at the 1988 and 2004 Olympics. He invented a mathematic formula that limits the crew weight in the Star Class nowadays.

References
 

1955 births
Living people
Sportspeople from Lübeck
German male sailors (sport)
Sailors at the 1988 Summer Olympics – Star
Sailors at the 2004 Summer Olympics – Star
Olympic sailors of Germany
Star class world champions
World champions in sailing for Germany